A Beautiful Mind is a 2001 American biographical drama film directed by Ron Howard. Written by Akiva Goldsman, its screenplay was inspired by Sylvia Nasar's 1998 biography of the mathematician John Nash, a Nobel Laureate in Economics. A Beautiful Mind stars Russell Crowe as Nash, along with Ed Harris, Jennifer Connelly, Paul Bettany, Adam Goldberg, Judd Hirsch, Josh Lucas, Anthony Rapp, and Christopher Plummer in supporting roles. The story begins in Nash's days as a graduate student at Princeton University. Early in the film, Nash begins to develop paranoid schizophrenia and endures delusional episodes while watching the burden his condition brings on his wife Alicia and friends.

A Beautiful Mind was released theatrically in the United States on December 21, 2001. It went on to gross over $313 million worldwide and won four Academy Awards, for Best Picture, Best Director, Best Adapted Screenplay and Best Supporting Actress for Connelly. It was also nominated for Best Actor, Best Film Editing, Best Makeup, and Best Original Score.

Plot

In 1947, John Nash arrives at Princeton University as a co-recipient, with Martin Hansen, of the Carnegie Scholarship for mathematics. He meets fellow math and science graduate students Sol, Ainsley, and Bender, as well as his roommate Charles Herman, a literature student.

Determined to publish his own original idea, Nash is inspired when he and his classmates discuss how to approach a group of women at a bar. Hansen quotes Adam Smith advocating "every man for himself", but Nash argues that a cooperative approach would lead to better chances of success in developing a new concept of governing dynamics. Publishing an article on his theory, he earns an appointment at MIT where he chooses Sol and Bender over Hansen to join him.

In 1953, Nash is invited to the Pentagon to study encrypted enemy telecommunications, which he deciphers mentally. Bored with his regular duties at MIT, including teaching, he is recruited by the mysterious William Parcher of the United States Department of Defense with a classified assignment: to look for hidden patterns in magazines and newspapers to thwart a Soviet plot. Nash becomes increasingly obsessive in his search for these patterns, delivering his results to a secret mailbox, and comes to believe he is being followed.

One of his students, Alicia Larde, asks him to dinner, and they fall in love. On a return visit to Princeton, Nash runs into Charles and his niece, Marcee. With Charles' encouragement, he proposes to Alicia and they marry. Nash fears for his life after surviving a shootout between Parcher and Soviet agents, and learns Alicia is pregnant, but he is forced to continue his assignment. While delivering a guest lecture at Harvard University, Nash tries to flee from people he thinks are Soviet agents, led by psychiatrist Dr. Rosen, but is forcibly sedated and committed to a psychiatric facility.

Dr. Rosen tells Alicia that Nash has schizophrenia and that Charles, Marcee, and Parcher exist only in his imagination. Alicia backs up the doctor, telling Nash that no "William Parcher" is in the Defense Department and takes out the unopened documents he delivered to the secret mailbox. Nash is given a course of insulin shock therapy and eventually released. Frustrated with the side effects of his antipsychotic medication, he secretly stops taking it and starts seeing Parcher and Charles again.

In 1956, Alicia discovers Nash has resumed his "assignment" in a shed near their home. Realizing he has relapsed, Alicia rushes to the house to find Nash had left their infant son in the running bathtub, believing "Charles" was watching the baby. Alicia calls Dr. Rosen, but Nash accidentally knocks her and the baby to the ground, believing he's fighting Parcher.

As Alicia flees with the baby, Nash fights with his visions and realizes that all of them have looked the same ever since he saw them. He stops Alicia's car and tells her he realizes that "Marcee" isn't real because she doesn't age, finally accepting that Parcher and other figures are hallucinations. Against Dr. Rosen's advice, Nash chooses not to restart his medication, believing he can deal with his symptoms himself, and Alicia decides to stay and support him.

Nash returns to Princeton, approaching his old rival Hansen, now head of the mathematics department, who allows him to work out of the library and audit classes. Over the next two decades, Nash learns to ignore his hallucinations and, by the late 1970s, is allowed to teach again.

In 1994, Nash is awarded the Nobel Memorial Prize in Economic Sciences for his revolutionary work on game theory, and is honored by his fellow professors. At the ceremony, he dedicates the prize to his wife. As Nash, Alicia, and their son leave the auditorium in Stockholm, Nash sees Charles, Marcee, and Parcher watching him, but merely glances at them before departing.

Cast

Production

Development
After producer Brian Grazer first read an excerpt of Sylvia Nasar's book A Beautiful Mind in Vanity Fair magazine, he immediately purchased the rights to the film. Grazer later said that many A-list directors were calling with their point of view on the project. He eventually brought the project to his long time partner and director Ron Howard.

Grazer met with a number of screenwriters, mostly consisting of "serious dramatists", but he chose Akiva Goldsman because of his strong passion and desire for the project. Goldsman's creative take on the project was to avoid having viewers understand they are viewing an alternative reality until a specific point in the film. This was done to rob the viewers of their understanding, to mimic how Nash comprehended his experiences. Howard agreed to direct the film based on the first draft. He asked Goldsman to emphasize the love story of Nash and his wife; she was critical to his being able to continue living at home.

Dave Bayer, a professor of mathematics at Barnard College, Columbia University, was consulted on the mathematical equations that appear in the film. For the scene where Nash has to teach a calculus class and gives them a complicated problem to keep them busy, Bayer chose a problem physically unrealistic but mathematically very rich, in keeping with Nash as "someone who really doesn't want to teach the mundane details, who will home in on what's really interesting". Bayer received a cameo role in the film as a professor who lays his pen down for Nash in the pen ceremony near the end of the film.

Greg Cannom was chosen to create the makeup effects for A Beautiful Mind, specifically the age progression of the characters. Crowe had previously worked with Cannom on The Insider. Howard had also worked with Cannom on Cocoon. Each character's stages of makeup were broken down by the number of years that would pass between levels. Cannom stressed subtlety between the stages, but worked toward the ultimate stage of "Older Nash". The production team originally decided that the makeup department would age Russell Crowe throughout the film; however, at Crowe's request, the makeup was used to push his look to resemble the facial features of John Nash. Cannom developed a new silicone-type makeup that could simulate skin and be used for overlapping applications; this shortened make-up application time from eight to four hours. Crowe was also fitted with a number of dentures to give him a slight overbite in the film.

Howard and Grazer chose frequent collaborator James Horner to score the film because they knew of his ability to communicate. Howard said, regarding Horner, "it's like having a conversation with a writer or an actor or another director". A running discussion between the director and the composer was the concept of high-level mathematics being less about numbers and solutions, and more akin to a kaleidoscope, in that the ideas evolve and change. After the first screening of the film, Horner told Howard: "I see changes occurring like fast-moving weather systems". He chose it as another theme to connect to Nash's ever-changing character. Horner chose Welsh singer Charlotte Church to sing the soprano vocals after deciding that he needed a balance between a child and adult singing voice. He wanted a "purity, clarity and brightness of an instrument" but also a vibrato to maintain the humanity of the voice.

The film was shot 90% chronologically. Three separate trips were made to the Princeton University campus. During filming, Howard decided that Nash's delusions should always be introduced first audibly and then visually. This provides a clue for the audience and establishes the delusions from Nash's point of view. The historic John Nash had only auditory delusions. The filmmakers developed a technique to represent Nash's mental epiphanies. Mathematicians described to them such moments as a sense of "the smoke clearing", "flashes of light" and "everything coming together", so the filmmakers used a flash of light appearing over an object or person to signify Nash's creativity at work. Two night shots were done at Fairleigh Dickinson University's campus in Florham Park, New Jersey, in the Vanderbilt Mansion ballroom. Portions of the film set at Harvard were filmed at Manhattan College. (Harvard has turned down most requests for on-location filming ever since the filming of Love Story (1970), which caused significant physical damage to trees on campus.)

Tom Cruise was considered for the lead role. Howard ultimately cast Russell Crowe. For the role of Alicia Nash, Rachel Weisz was offered the role but turned it down. Charlize Theron and Julia Ormond auditioned for the role. According to Ron Howard, the four finalists for the role of Alicia were Ashley Judd, Claire Forlani, Mary McCormack and Jennifer Connelly, with Connelly winning the role. Before the casting of Connelly, Hilary Swank and Salma Hayek were also candidates for the part.

Writing
The narrative of the film differs considerably from the events of Nash's life, as filmmakers made choices for the sense of the story. The film has been criticized for this aspect, but the filmmakers said they never intended a literal representation of his life.

One difficulty was the portrayal of his mental illness and trying to find a visual film language for this. As a matter of fact, Nash never had visual hallucinations: Charles Herman (the "roommate"), Marcee Herman and William Parcher (the Defense agent) are a scriptwriter's invention. Sylvia Nasar said that the filmmakers "invented a narrative that, while far from a literal telling, is true to the spirit of Nash's story". Nash spent his years between Princeton and MIT as a consultant for the RAND Corporation in California, but in the film he is portrayed as having worked for the Department of Defense at the Pentagon instead. His handlers, both from faculty and administration, had to introduce him to assistants and strangers. The PBS documentary A Brilliant Madness tried to portray his life more accurately.

Few of the characters in the film, besides John and Alicia Nash, correspond directly to actual people. The discussion of the Nash equilibrium was criticized as over-simplified. In the film, Nash has schizophrenic hallucinations while he is in graduate school, but in his life he did not have this experience until some years later. No mention is made of Nash's homosexual experiences at RAND, which are noted in the biography, though both Nash and his wife deny this occurred. Nash fathered a son, John David Stier (born June 19, 1953), by Eleanor Agnes Stier (1921–2005), a nurse whom he abandoned when she told him of her pregnancy. The film did not include Alicia's divorce of John in 1963. It was not until after Nash won the Nobel Memorial Prize in 1994 that they renewed their relationship. Beginning in 1970, Alicia allowed him to live with her as a boarder. They remarried in 2001.

Nash is shown to join Wheeler Laboratory at MIT, but there is no such lab. Instead, he was appointed as C. L. E. Moore instructor at MIT, and later as a professor. The film furthermore does not touch on the revolutionary work of John Nash in differential geometry and partial differential equations, such as the Nash embedding theorem or his proof of Hilbert's nineteenth problem, work which he did in his time at MIT and for which he was given the Abel Prize in 2015. The so-called pen ceremony tradition at Princeton shown in the film is completely fictitious. The film has Nash saying in 1994: "I take the newer medications", but in fact, he did not take any medication from 1970 onwards, something highlighted in Nasar's biography. Howard later stated that they added the line of dialogue because they worried that the film would be criticized for suggesting that all people with schizophrenia can overcome their illness without medication. In addition, Nash never gave an acceptance speech for his Nobel prize.

Release and response
A Beautiful Mind received a limited release on December 21, 2001, receiving positive reviews, with Crowe receiving wide acclaim for his performance. It was later released in the United States on January 4, 2002.

Critical response
On Rotten Tomatoes, A Beautiful Mind holds an approval rating of 74% based on 213 reviews and an average score of 7.20/10. The website's critical consensus states: "The well-acted A Beautiful Mind is both a moving love story and a revealing look at mental illness." On Metacritic, the film has a weighted average score of 72 out of 100 based on 33 reviews, indicating "generally favorable reviews". Audiences polled by CinemaScore gave the film an average grade of "A-" on an A+ to F scale.

Roger Ebert of Chicago Sun-Times gave the film four out of four stars. Mike Clark of USA Today gave three-and-a-half out of four stars and also praised Crowe's performance, calling it a welcome follow-up to Howard's previous film, 2001's How the Grinch Stole Christmas. Desson Thomson of The Washington Post found the film to be "one of those formulaically rendered Important Subject movies". The portrayal of mathematics in the film was praised by the mathematics community, including John Nash himself.

John Sutherland of The Guardian noted the film's biopic distortions, but said:

Writing in the Los Angeles Times, Lisa Navarrette criticized the casting of Jennifer Connelly as Alicia Nash as an example of whitewashing. Alicia Nash was born in El Salvador and had an accent not portrayed in the film.

Box office
During the five-day weekend of the limited release, A Beautiful Mind opened at the #12 spot at the box office, peaking at the #2 spot following the wide release. The film went on to gross $170,742,341 in the United States and Canada and $313,542,341 worldwide.

Awards and nominations

 In 2006, it was named No. 93 in AFI's 100 Years... 100 Cheers. In the following year, it was nominated for AFI's 100 Years...100 Movies (10th Anniversary Edition).

Home media
A Beautiful Mind was released on VHS and DVD, in wide- and full-screen editions, in North America on June 25, 2002. The DVD set includes audio commentaries, deleted scenes, and documentaries. The film was also released on Blu-ray in North America on January 25, 2011.

Soundtrack

See also

 List of American films of 2001
 List of films about mathematicians
 Mental illness in films

Notes

References

Further reading
 Akiva Goldsman. A Beautiful Mind: Screenplay and Introduction. New York, New York: Newmarket Press, 2002. .

External links

 
 
 
 
 
 
 A Beautiful Mind at MSN Movies
 A Beautiful Mind at Film Insight

2001 biographical drama films
2001 drama films
2001 films
2000s American films
American biographical drama films
BAFTA winners (films)
Best Drama Picture Golden Globe winners
Best Picture Academy Award winners
Drama films based on actual events
2000s English-language films
Films about schizophrenia
Films based on biographies
Films featuring a Best Drama Actor Golden Globe winning performance
Films featuring a Best Supporting Actress Academy Award-winning performance
Films featuring a Best Supporting Actress Golden Globe-winning performance
Films shot in New Jersey
Films set in New Jersey
Films set in Massachusetts
Films set in Virginia
Films set in the 1940s
Films set in the 1950s
Films set in the 1960s
Films set in the 1970s
Films set in the 1990s
Films set in universities and colleges
Films whose director won the Best Directing Academy Award
Films whose writer won the Best Adapted Screenplay Academy Award
Films about disability
Films about mathematics
Films about Nobel laureates
Princeton University
Biographical films about mathematicians
Biographical films about educators
Cultural depictions of mathematicians
Cultural depictions of economists
Cultural depictions of American men
Films scored by James Horner
Films with screenplays by Akiva Goldsman
Films produced by Brian Grazer
Films produced by Ron Howard
Films directed by Ron Howard
Universal Pictures films
DreamWorks Pictures films
Imagine Entertainment films